Manteca High School is a public, co-educational secondary school in Manteca, California, United States that was established on May 21, 1920. It is the oldest school within Manteca Unified School District. Although originally built with a tower, it was torn down because the structure failed to meet earthquake regulations.

Athletics

Manteca High is mainly known for the success in its football program.  The Buffaloes are one of the most victorious teams in the area and have won nine section titles since the beginning of the 21st century (2001, 2005, 2006, 2013, 2016, 2017, 2019, 2021, 2022) with 13 appearances.  They also had the state's longest winning streak (26) for a few months that stretched from October 21, 2005, to October 19, 2007. Additionally, Manteca has won a total of 15 Sac-Joaquin Section Team Championships (6 since 2013) and 32 Individual Sac-Joaquin Section Championships in the sports of wrestling, basketball, track & field, golf, tennis and swimming. The baseball team won its first ever section and state championship in 2014, followed by another section title in 2016. The girls soccer team won its first ever section championship in 2016 as well, followed by a girls tennis section title the same year. Finally, also in 2016, Manteca won its first state title in boys basketball by defeating Ayala High School of Chino Hills 60–51. It was the first state championship in boys basketball in Manteca Unified history.

Notable alumni

 Ernie Barber, former NFL center for the Washington Redskins
 Jay Blahnik, fitness expert, author, speaker and Vice-President of Fitness Technologies for Apple Inc.
 Milo Candini, former Major League Baseball player
 Sammy L. Davis, Medal of Honor recipient
 Tony Dominguez Jr., retired professional boxer
 Kiwi Gardner, basketball player
 Ken Huckaby, Major League Baseball player
 Kim Komenich, Pulitzer Prize-winning photojournalist
 John J. McFall, former Democratic member of the United States House of Representatives
 Don Morgan, former NFL strong safety for the Minnesota Vikings and Arizona Cardinals
 Ted Nuce, World Champion bull rider, Pro Rodeo Hall of Fame
 Justin Roiland, executive producer, voice actor and co-creator of Rick and Morty
 Paul Wiggin, former American football player and coach 
 Kenny Wooten, NBA player for the New York Knicks

References

External links 
 

High schools in San Joaquin County, California
Public high schools in California
Educational institutions established in 1920
1920 establishments in California
Manteca, California